The 1848 United States presidential election in North Carolina took place on November 7, 1848, as part of the 1848 United States presidential election. Voters chose 11 representatives, or electors to the Electoral College, who voted for President and Vice President.

North Carolina voted for the Whig candidate Zachary Taylor over Democratic candidate Lewis Cass. Taylor won North Carolina by a margin of 10.37%.

Results

References

North Carolina
1848
1848 North Carolina elections